Vanadium(II) sulfate describes a family of inorganic compounds with the formula VSO4(H2O)x where 0 ≤ x ≤ 7.  The hexahydrate is most commonly encountered.  It is a violet solid that dissolves in water to give air-sensitive solutions of the aquo complex.  The salt is isomorphous with [Mg(H2O)6]SO4.  Compared to the V–O bond length of 191 pm in [V(H2O)6]3+, the V–O distance is 212 pm in the [V(H2O)6]SO4.  This nearly 10% elongation reflects the effect of the lower charge, hence weakened electrostatic attraction.  

The heptahydrate has also been crystallized. The compound is prepared by electrolytic reduction of vanadyl sulfate in sulfuric acid.  The crystals also feature [V(H2O)6]2+ centers but with an extra water of crystallization.  The salt is isomorphous with ferrous sulfate heptahydrate. A related salt is vanadous ammonium sulfate, (NH4)2V(SO4)2·6H2O, a Tutton's salt isomorphous with ferrous ammonium sulfate.

References

Vanadium(II) compounds
Sulfates